Radical 67 or radical script meaning "script" or "literature" is one of the 34 Kangxi radicals (214 radicals in total) composed of 4 strokes.

In the Kangxi Dictionary, there are 26 characters (out of 49,030) to be found under this radical.

 is also the 93rd indexing component in the Table of Indexing Chinese Character Components predominantly adopted by Simplified Chinese dictionaries published in mainland China.

Evolution

Derived characters

The Unihan Database classifies the Simplified Chinese character  and Japanese shinjitai  and  under this radical. However,  actually belongs to radical  (Simplified Chinese characters radical #140, =Kangxi Radical 210) in mainland China's standard and Simplified Chinese dictionaries;  and  usually falls under radical  (or "" depending on each dictionary's standard) in Japanese dictionaries.

Literature

References

External links

Unihan Database - U+6587

067
093